Ye Olde Fighting Cocks is a public house in St Albans, Hertfordshire, England. It is one of several pubs that lay claim to being the oldest in England, claiming to have been in business since 793 AD. The pub was once recognized as the oldest in England by the Guinness World Records, but this title was wrested in 2000. The building is described by Historic England as being of 16th-century appearance, but as the earliest date for which it can be proved to have been licensed is 1756, and even that date is not certain, its claim to this record is somewhat uncertain. Others such as the Ye Olde Man & Scythe in Bolton, Greater Manchester, and Ye Olde Trip to Jerusalem in Nottingham may have better claims. Even in St Albans, the White Hart and the Fleur de Lys (currently called 'The Snug') are believed to have been trading as inns in the late medieval period.

Location
The pub is at the end of Abbey Mill Lane beside the River Ver, just outside the perimeter of Verulamium Park, not far from St Albans Cathedral in Hertfordshire.

Architecture
The main structure is free-standing and has an octagonal appearance, attributable to its original use as a pigeon house. It has been added to over the years but the original timber-framed structure is clearly visible. It was originally close to St Albans Cathedral (when it was St Albans Abbey) and was moved to the present site sometime after the dissolution of the Abbey in 1539. Its foundations are claimed to be even older, dating from around 793 but again this is dubious. It is claimed that there are tunnels running between the cathedral and the pub's beer cellars which were once used by monks.

As with many old buildings, the ceilings are quite low. An original bread-oven is next to one of the fireplaces. It has a large beer garden with different seating arrangements, as well as seats out the front.

History

The main structure of the building was built in the 11th century and was originally used as a pigeon house.

The building, in its current location, was originally known as The Round House but there is no record of it being licensed as a public house under that name. The first known reference to it being an alehouse is in 1756 when it appears to be trading as The Three Pigeons. Around 1800 its name changed to the Fighting Cocks, perhaps in reference to the sport of cock fighting which was popular at the time and which may have taken place in the main bar area. The prefix "Ye olde..." is a late Victorian affectation. It is known by locals as 'The Fighters' or 'The Cocks'.

In 1950 the building was listed.

In 2015 PETA wrote to the pub's landlord and its owners, Mitchells & Butlers, requesting that they change the name due to its cockfighting association. The request was declined. 

In February 2022, the pub went into administration, though the owner was hopeful that a buyer would be found for the business.

In popular culture
The Cocks was featured in an exterior scene in "The Sins of the Fathers", a 1990 episode of the ITV series Inspector Morse.  The setting was the beer garden along the River Ver, with the pub's large sign plainly visible in the background. It also features in the third series of Ricky Gervais' sitcom After Life.

References

External links

Pubs in St Albans
Grade II listed pubs in Hertfordshire
Olde Fighting Cocks
Octagonal buildings in the United Kingdom
Timber framed pubs in Hertfordshire
Companies that have entered administration in the United Kingdom